Lo Más Lejos a Tu Lado (English: Further Next to You) is the third studio album by Spanish rock band Fito & Fitipaldis. It was published by DRO in 2003.

Track listing

Chart performance

Certifications

Reception

Lo más lejos a tu lado has received very positive reviews. Rolling Stone Spain claimed that is their best album and also was ranked number 26 on Rolling Stone's "50 Greatest Spanish rock albums".

References 

2003 albums
Fito & Fitipaldis albums
Spanish-language albums